Perth Soccer Club is an Australian professional soccer club based in West Perth, Western Australia. The club was founded in 1987 as the result of a merger between three local sides, though its pre-merger history is regarded to be that of Perth Azzurri after taking full control of the club in 2002. Perth currently competes in the National Premier Leagues Western Australia, with matches played at Dorrien Gardens.

History
The club was formed in 1987 as a result of a merger of Perth Azzurri (formed 1948), East Fremantle Tricolore (formed 1953) and Balcatta Etna (formed 1977). After numerous meetings and discussions the new club known as, named Perth Italia Soccer Club, was formed. Of the three clubs that merged, Perth Azzurri was the most successful club having won 11 league titles. 

The club had its beginnings when a group of boys joined with the initial intention of starting an Australian rules football club. The club faced friction from the footballing establishment which disapproved of Azzurri's passionate style of play. Between 1953 and 1987 East Fremantle Tricolore also won six league titles, including three straight wins between 1963 and 1965. Balcatta Etna had the least success, with only one league title.

Representatives from all three clubs strongly contributed in establishing the finest club and facilities in Western Australia. In the late 1980s the club registered the name Perth United in anticipation of joining the National Soccer League. However the club never managed to join the national league.

In 1991 Balcatta Etna left the merged club. In 1995 it was decided to change the name to Perth Soccer Club in order to broaden its appeal to a more mainstream audience. In 2002 Azzurri fully merged with Perth SC to become the club it is today, with East Fremantle Tricolore leaving the merged club to play in their own right in 2004.

Men's team

Current squad

Honours

Premiers – 1953, 1959, 1960, 1962 (WASFA), 1967, 1968, 1969, 1971, 1975, 1976, 1981, 1992, 1993, 2002, 2003, 2005, 2016, 2018, 2021
 Champions or Top Four/Five Cup –,1963, 1966, 1967, 1972, 1974, 1976, 1989, 1990, 1991, 1993, 2000, 2001, 2002, 2003, 2008, 2009, 2010, 2011, 2016, 2018, 2021
 D’Orsogna Cup – 1960, 1965, 1969, 1970, 1971, 1973, 1981, 1990, 1993
 WA State Cups 2001, 2005
 Night Series Cup – 1962, 1968, 1970, 1971, 1973, 1975, 1981
 Night Series – 1989, 1990, 1992, 1998, 2001, 2002, 2004, 2006, 2007, 2008, 2009, 2010

Women's team
The Perth SC Women's team are one of the inaugural teams in the new National Premier Leagues WA Women competition (which commenced in 2020), and is a part of the National Premier Leagues Women’s structure. The team is coached by Peter Rakic with Jessica Byrne as his assistant. The Perth SC women's team finished second in the NPLW WA in the 2022 season.

Current squad

Notable former players

Gary Marocchi, Ron Adair, Bobby Charlton (Guest Player), Peter Holt, John Van Oosten, Nino Segon, Tommy Maras, Bruno Marocchi, Allan Pottier, David O'Callaghan, Aldo Trinca, Willie Kelly, Ronnie Campbell, Paul Tombides, Steve Tombides, Shaun Murphy, Scott Miller, Peter Murphy, Glen Guidici, Brian Newell, Tommy Carruthers, Saverio Madaschi, Anthony Carbone, Robbie Dunn, Gareth Naven, Craig Naven, Frank Faraone, Chris Coyne, Adrian Madaschi, Dino Djulbic, Dylan Tombides, Gianfranco Circati, Alessandro Circati, Danielle Brogan,

References

External links
 Official club website

National Premier Leagues clubs
Football West State League teams
Association football clubs established in 1987
1987 establishments in Australia
Soccer clubs in Perth, Western Australia
Italian-Australian backed sports clubs of Western Australia